Matei Pampoulov (born 29 April 1949) is a Bulgarian former professional tennis player.

Biography
A right-handed player from Plovdiv, Pampoulov appeared in 15 Davis Cup ties for Bulgaria, from 1969 to 1982. His regular doubles partner was twin brother Bozhidar, who unlike his brother was a left-hander. As a combination they won a Bulgarian record five Davis Cup rubbers.

Pampoulov and his brother were in the main draw of the doubles at the 1973 Wimbledon Championships but conceded a walkover. As a singles player he reached the third qualifying round for the 1975 French Open and also featured in Wimbledon qualifying during his career.

His family have continued to pursue the sport, with nephew Luben and niece Elena also competing professionally.

References

External links
 
 
 

1949 births
Living people
Bulgarian male tennis players
Twin sportspeople
Bulgarian twins
Sportspeople from Plovdiv
Universiade medalists in tennis
Universiade silver medalists for Bulgaria
Universiade bronze medalists for Bulgaria
20th-century Bulgarian people